The London Book of the Dead is the seventh album by British band The Real Tuesday Weld.

Track listing
"Blood Sugar Love" – 3:15
"The Decline and Fall of the Clerkenwell Kid" – 3:00
"It's a Wonderful Li(f)e" – 3:10
"Cloud Cuckooland" – 3:15
"Kix" – 3:03
"Love Sugar Blood" – 1:08
"I Loved London" – 3:07
"I Believe" – 3:45
"Song for William" – 1:06
"Waltz for One" – 1:54
"Ruth, Roses and Revolvers" – 3:51
"Dorothy Parker Blue" – 4:53
"Last Words" – 4:54
"Into the Trees" – 1:20
"Bringing the Body Back Home" – 5:49
"Apart" – 1:28

2007 albums
The Real Tuesday Weld albums